Corrientes International Airport , also known as Doctor Fernando Piragine Niveyro International Airport ( and Cambá Punta) is an airport in Corrientes Province, Argentina, serving the city of Corrientes, built in 1961 while the terminal was completed in 1964. A new terminal and a new control tower were constructed between 2009 and 2011. The old buildings were demolished.

Between April 2014 and October 2015, Corrientes Airport was closed because of works on its runway.

Airlines and destinations

References

External links
Organismo Regulador del Sistema Nacional de Aeropuertos
Airport will be closed 3 months

Airports in Argentina